Red, Yellow & Blue is the debut album by the indie-rock band Born Ruffians. It was released on March 4, 2008, in the United States and Canada and May 26 in the UK/Europe. "Hummingbird" was the first single off the album, followed by "Foxes Mate for Life". The band teamed up with Rusty Santos, collaborator for Animal Collective and Grizzly Bear, to produce this album. It was recorded at Chemical Sound in Toronto, except the track "Hedonistic Me," which was recorded at Sleepytown Studio (Toronto).

Track listing
 "Red, Yellow & Blue" – 2:32
 "Barnacle Goose" – 3:39
 "Hummingbird" – 3:08
 "I Need a Life" – 3:27
 "Little Garçon" – 4:10
 "Badonkadonkey" – 2:57
 "Foxes Mate for Life" – 4:30
 "Hedonistic Me" – 2:40
 "In a Mirror" – 3:05
 "Kurt Vonnegut" – 4:04
 "Red Elephant" – 5:19

References

2008 debut albums
Born Ruffians albums
Warp (record label) albums